Events in the year 1921 in Bulgaria.

Incumbents

Events 

 The Macedonian Federative Organization (MFO) was established in Sofia by former Internal Macedonian Revolutionary Organization (IMRO) left wing's activists.

References 

 
1920s in Bulgaria
Years of the 20th century in Bulgaria
Bulgaria
Bulgaria